Garfield Archer (June 9, 1880 – November 13, 1940) was an American politician. He served as a Republican member of the Kansas House of Representatives.

Life and career 
Archer was born in Densmore, Kansas. He was a farmer.

In 1933, Archer was elected to the Kansas House of Representatives, serving until 1936.

Archer died in November 1940 of a heart attack at his home in Densmore, Kansas, at the age of 60.

References 

1880 births
1940 deaths
Republican Party members of the Kansas House of Representatives
20th-century American politicians
Farmers from Kansas